Events in the year 1874 in Belgium.

Incumbents
Monarch: Leopold II
Head of government: Barthélémy de Theux de Meylandt (to 21 August); Jules Malou (from 21 August)

Events
 20 January – Royal decree providing for subsidies to the dramatic arts.
 19 March – Extradition treaty with the United States of America.
 25 May – Provincial elections
 1 June – Service starts on Brussels–Charleroi railway line. Nivelles railway station inaugurated.
 9 June – Partial legislative elections of 1874
 21 August – Prime Minister Barthélémy de Theux de Meylandt dies in office; succeeded by Jules Malou
 2 September – Convention with The Netherlands for improvements to the Ghent–Terneuzen Canal signed in Brussels.
 10 September – Postal convention with Peru signed in Brussels.
 24 December – Extradition treaty with the German Empire, replacing earlier treaties with individual German states.

Publications
 Pasinomie: collection complète des lois, décrets, ordonnances, arrêtés et règlements généraux qui peuvent être invoqués en Belgique. 1874. (Brussels).

 Émile de Laveleye, De la Proprieté et de ses Formes Primitives
 Eugène Van Bemmel, Patria Belgica: Encyclopédie nationale, vol. 2 (Brussels, Bruylant-Christophe & Cie., 1874)

Art and architecture

Paintings
 Jean-François Portaels, Juive de Tanger

Births
 13 January – Jozef-Ernest van Roey, archbishop (died 1961)
 26 February – Gaston-Antoine Rasneur, bishop (died 1939) 
 19 April – Firmin Baes, painter (died 1943)

Deaths
 17 February – Adolphe Quetelet (born 1796), mathematician
 23 May – Sylvain Van de Weyer (born 1802), politician
 4 July – Hippolyte Boulenger (born 1837), painter
 21 August – Barthélémy de Theux de Meylandt (born 1794)
 6 December –  Gustaf Wappers (born 1803), painter

References

 
Belgium
Years of the 19th century in Belgium
1870s in Belgium
Belgium